Shri Kedar Temple (also known as Kedareswara Temple) is a medieval Hindu temple dedicated to Shiva located at top of Madanachala hill in Hajo, Kamrup, Assam. The central chamber has a linga. The temple, along with the two walls adjacent,  build by Ahom King  Rajeswara Singha in 1753. The linga in this temple is considered as Swayambhu - the one that originates itself and is not crafted or made.

References 

Tourist attractions in Assam
Tourism in Assam
Hindu temples in Assam
Shiva temples in Assam
Hindu temples in Kamrup district
18th-century Hindu temples